The Panvel–Vasai Road MEMU is a Mainline Electrical Multiple Unit train belonging to Western Railway zone that runs between  and  in India. It is currently being operated with 69165/69166/69167/69168 train numbers on a daily basis.

Service 

Panvel–Vasai Road MEMU has an average speed of 40 km/hr and covers 63 km in 1h 35m.
Vasai Road–Panvel MEMU has an average speed of 40 km/hr and covers 63 km in 1h 35m.

Route and halts

The important halts of the train are:

See also 

 Vasai Road railway station
 Panvel Junction railway station
 Vasai Road–Diva DEMU
 Panvel–Dahanu Road MEMU

Notes

References

External links 

 69167/Panvel–Vasai Road MEMU
 69166/Vasai Road–Panvel MEMU
 69165/Panvel–Vasai Road MEMU
 69168/Vasai Road–Panvel MEMU

Rail transport in Maharashtra
Electric multiple units of India
Transport in Panvel
Transport in Vasai-Virar
Railway services introduced in 2011